The political structure of Assam in India is headed by the ceremonial post of the Governor.  He is assisted by a council of ministers, headed by the Chief Minister, who are members of the Assam Assembly.  In recent years the Governor has become more powerful, especially because the last two Governors have been ex-Army generals and the Army is entrusted with anti-insurgency operations against ULFA and other armed groups .

History
The Assam legislative structure is unicameral and consists of the 126-member Assam Assembly.  Members are elected for a period of 5 years.  The Assam Assembly is presided over by the Speaker, who is generally a member of the ruling party.

State Government

National Legislature

Assam sends 14 Member of Parliament(s) to the Lok Sabha.

Karimganj 1 – All India United Democratic Front
Silchar 2 – Indian National Congress
Autonomous District 3 – Indian National Congress
Dhubri 4 – All India United Democratic Front
Kokrajhar 5 – Independent
Barpeta 6 – All India United Democratic Front
Gauhati 7 – Bharatiya Janata Party
Mangaldoi 8 – Bharatiya Janata Party
Tezpur 9 – Bharatiya Janata Party
Nowgong 10 – Bharatiya Janata Party
Kaliabor 11 – Indian National Congress
Jorhat 12 – Bharatiya Janata Party
Dibrugarh 13 – Bharatiya Janata Party
Lakhimpur 14 – Bharatiya Janata Party

See also
United Tribal Nationalist Liberation Front

References

External links
 Assam Assembly - Official website